Mirošovice is a municipality and village in Prague-East District in the Central Bohemian Region of the Czech Republic. It has about 1,500 inhabitants.

Geography
It lies in the Benešov Uplands.

History
The first written mention of Mirošovice is from 1250.

Transport
The D1 motorway passes through the municipality. The I/3 road (part of European route E55) separates from it in Mirošovice.

Mirošovice is located on the railway line Prague–Benešov.

Sights
Mirošovice is poor in monuments. The only cultural monument are the fragments of the Ježov Castle, located at the southern municipal border. It is a torso of a medieval castle which stood here from the 13th to the 15th century.

References

External links

Villages in Prague-East District